200 (two hundred) is the natural number following 199 and preceding 201.

200 is an abundant number, as 265, the sum of its proper divisors, is greater than itself.

The number appears in the Padovan sequence, preceded by 86, 114, 151 (it is the sum of the first two of these).

The sum of Euler's totient function φ(x) over the first twenty-five integers is 200.

200 is the smallest base 10 unprimeable number – it cannot be turned into a prime number by changing just one of its digits to any other digit. It is also a Harshad number.

200 is an Achilles number.

Two hundred is also:
 A common ISO-standard film speed for photographic films. However, 200 speed film is being phased out in consumer films in favor of faster films.
 A denomination of the euro note. The 200 euro note was designed by Robert Kalina.
 200 MeV is the temperature of quark–gluon plasma phase transition.
 An HTTP status code indicating a successful connection; the code is "200 OK".
 The sum of pounds (or dollars) given in the classical Monopoly game to a player passing Go.
 A cholesterol level of 200 and below is considered "desirable level corresponding to lower risk for heart disease".
 The  exact number of NASCAR Cup Series races won by Richard Petty.
 An early AD year.
 "200" is the title of an episode of South Park, which is infamous for its portrayal of Muhammed leading to the creators of the show receiving death threats from terrorists.
 A vehicle that has reached 200 mph.
 The North West 200, a motorcycle race held in Northern Ireland.

References

Integers